Joseph Maria Bonaldus was the Archbishop of Antivari in 1646–1652. He belonged to the Dominican Order.

Originally from Zara (Zadar), Republic of Venice (present-day Croatia), Bonaldo served a theological professor in the Basilica of Santa Maria above Minerva in Rome.

Pope Innocent X appointed Bonaldo as the Archbishop of Antivari in 1646 with an annual income of 200 Roman scudi.

With the bishops from Ottoman-controlled lands, Bonaldo forged plans for freedom, presenting them to the Venetian admiral, Leonardo Foscolo. When Foscolo captured Klis in 1648, in his company was Bonaldo. The following year, Foscolo turned to southern Montenegro, unloading his guns near Antivari. However, the Ottoman army was awaiting his arrival to which Foscolo retreated. By then, a pogrom among Antivari's Catholic population occurred, in which a large number of Catholics converted to Islam.

Bonaldo lived in the region of Paštrovići, where he converted many Muslims to Catholicism.

Bonaldo died from tuberculosis in 1653. He was buried in a cathedral in Budva. Upon his death, the administration of the Archbishopric was placed in the hands of Pjetër Bogdani, the Bishop of Scutari.

References
 

1653 deaths
Archbishops of Antivari
17th-century Croatian Roman Catholic priests
17th-century Roman Catholic archbishops in the Republic of Venice
Croatian Dominicans
Year of birth unknown
Venetian period in the history of Montenegro